Gilang is a given name. Notable people with the name include:

 Gilang Angga (born 1980), Indonesian footballer
 Gilang Ginarsa (born 1988), Indonesian footballer
 Gilang Ramadhan (born 1995), Indonesian beach volleyball player

Indonesian given names